The Kos Minars (translated: Mile Pillars) are medieval Indian milestones along the Grand Trunk Road in northern Indian subcontinent, that were introduced by the 16th-century Pashtun ruler Sher Shah Suri. Kos Minars were erected to serve as markers of distance along royal routes from Agra to Ajmer, Agra to Lahore, and from Agra to Mandu in the south.   

Most of the Kos Minars are present in Uttar Pradesh, Rajasthan, Haryana, and Punjab by the roadsides, railway tracks, paddy fields and in many towns and villages.   

Kos Minars were described as a "marvel of India" by early European travellers such as Sir Thomas Roe and have been labeled as an integral part of India's ''national communication system" by Archaeological Survey of India.

Characteristics
A kos in Sanskrit is one fourth of a yojana, an ancient Indian unit of distance. A minar is an Arabic word for tower.

They are not identical. As milestones, they were an important part of communication and travel.

History

Maurya period
In the third century BC, emperor Ashoka improved existing routes linking his capital city Pataliputra to Dhaka in the east and Kabul via Peshawar in the west and further to Balkh. These routes had landmarks in the form of mud pillars, trees or even wells to guide commuters.

Sur period
The 16th-century Pashtun ruler Sher Shah Suri introduces improved brick pillars plastered over with lime at every kos. The minars thus came to be called as kos minars.

Mughal period
Abul Fazl recorded in Akbar Nama that in the year 1575 AD, Akbar issued an order that, at every kos on the way from Agra to Ajmer, a pillar or a minar should be erected for the comfort of the travelers. In addition, many caravanserais (roadside inns) were built for travelers. Later emperors such as Shah Jahan continued to add to the network of Kos Minars. In the Mughal period, there were around 600 minars. In the north, they were extended as far as Peshawar and in the east to Bengal via Kannauj.

Deterioration and preservation
As the British introduced Imperial units and later, independent India adopted the International System of Units, the kos unit of measurement and consequently these minars went out of use. The monuments gradually went into a state of disrepair, as contemporary people ignored their significance. Only 110 Kos minars are left. According to a report of the Archaeology Survey of India, there are 49  in Haryana alone. There are also five Kos Minars around Ludhiana city. Restoration work for nine Kos Minars near Mathura began in 2018. The Archaeology Survey of India has given Kos Minars protected status and courts have ordered encroachments cleared away.

Photo Gallery

See also

List of Monuments of National Importance in Haryana, contains over a dozen Kos Minars in Haryana

References

Buildings and structures completed in the 16th century
Road transport in India
Mughal architecture
Monuments and memorials in India
Ruins in India
History of transport in India
Archaeological monuments in Uttar Pradesh
Monuments and memorials in Punjab, India
Road signs in India
Historical markers
16th-century establishments in India
Road signs in Pakistan
Ruins in Pakistan
History of transport in Uttar Pradesh
Milestones